Daraw (from Akhmimic ) is a city in the Aswan Governorate, Egypt.

Geography 
It is located on the eastern bank of the Nile, six kilometers south of Kom Ombo and 38 kilometers north of the city of Aswan. Its population is 59,765 in 2020. In addition to the center, four nearby villages belong to the administrative area of Daraw. For a long time, Daraw was the most important camel market in Egypt.

See also 

 List of cities and towns in Egypt

References 

Populated places in Aswan Governorate